Michael Joiner (born October 28, 1981) is an American former professional basketball player and current assistant coach for the Memphis Hustle of the NBA G League. He is 6'7" and played the small forward and sometimes power forward positions.

Born in Kansas City, Missouri, Joiner graduated from Seventy-First High School in 2000. He attended Florida State University.

In 2007, Joiner averaged 19.3 points per game in his 18 matches for the Canterbury Rams in the New Zealand National Basketball League.

For the 2008–09 season, Joiner averaged 8.5 points, 4.9 rebounds and 1.5 assists per game for the Sioux Falls Skyforce in the NBA Development League.

Coaching career
For the 2019–20 season, Joiner was added to the coaching staff of the G League’s Memphis Hustle as an assistant.

References

External links
Florida State Seminoles bio

1981 births
Living people
American expatriate basketball people in New Zealand
American men's basketball players
Austin Toros players
Basketball coaches from North Carolina
Basketball players from North Carolina
Canterbury Rams players
Florida State Seminoles men's basketball players
Memphis Hustle coaches
Saitama Broncos players
Sioux Falls Skyforce players
Small forwards
Sportspeople from Fayetteville, North Carolina